The Spain women's national basketball team represents Spain in international women's basketball competition, and are regulated by the Spanish Basketball Federation, the governing body for basketball in Spain. Spain has one of the most successful women's national teams in the world, being the current World Cup bronze medallists.

History
Spain women's basketball team played their first official game in Malgrat de Mar, Barcelona, against Switzerland on 16 June 1963, losing 31–40. They won their first game against the same team two days later, 47–39. It would take six years to play another international friendly game, losing to Cuba 50–70 on 28 September 1969.     

Their first official games were in March 1970, trying to qualify for 1970 EuroBasket, winning their first game against Switzerland 61–44 and losing to Hungary and France. The team qualified for their first major international tournament in their next attempt, the 1974 EuroBasket. After losing their three group stage games, they won their first game in a final tournament against Denmark in the placement matches, finishing in 12th position. Rosa Castillo is considered the best player from the mid-70s to the mid-80s.

Until 1985 Spain played most Eurobasket tournaments, usually finishing around 10th. An important year for the evolution of the team was the celebration on home soil of the 1987 EuroBasket, finishing on 6th position. The team entered their first Summer Olympics qualification in 1988, but failed to qualify. Their first Olympic games were also on home soil in the 1992 Summer Olympics, finishing 5th.

After failing to qualify for the two previous Eurobaskets and having never played a knockout game in a major tournament, the gold medal at the 1993 EuroBasket came as a surprise, beating the newly formed Slovakia in the semi-finals 73–55 and France in the final 63–53. With Blanca Ares as their key player (19 PPG), Spain undoubtedly took advantage of the dissolution of the dominant European teams of Yugoslavia, Czechoslovakia, and especially the Soviet Union.

The EuroBasket victory gave Spain the right to participate in the 1994 Women's World Cup for the first time, finishing 8th. Since then, the team has qualified for every World Cup -seven in a row-, winning three medals.

From 2001 and up to 2009 Spain entered in a loop of winning five consecutive medals in the Eurobaskets (1 silver, 4 bronze) and being eliminated in the quarterfinals in Summer Olympics and World Cups, until they finally won bronze in the 2010 Women's World Cup. From her debut in 1995 to her retirement in 2013, forward Amaya Valdemoro became the leader of the Spanish squad, taking part in 13 tournaments, playing 258 games, winning 7 medals and becoming the topscorer with 2,743 points.

The defeat against Croatia on 26 June in Katowice in the second stage of the 2011 EuroBasket  and the consequent absence from the 2012 Olympics has been cited by coaches and players as a catalyst for a golden period of seven consecutive medals under coach Lucas Mondelo. After playing the qualification matches in the summer of 2012, Spain went on to win the 2013 EuroBasket with a balance of 9–0. Afterwards, they won silver in the 2014 Women's World Cup, bronze in the 2015 EuroBasket, silver in the 2016 Summer Olympics and gold again in the 2017 EuroBasket. Spain also won the bronze medal at the 2018 Women's World Cup held on home soil in September 2018. In July 2019 Spain successfully defended their European crown by beating France 86–66 in the final of the EuroBasket Women 2019. These seven successful tournaments came to a halt in the summer of 2021, when the team finished 7th in the 2021 EuroBasket played in home soil and 6th in the 2020 Olympic Games.  These results are quite commendable, considering that Spain have only competed with the world elite for two decades. This series of results has taken the Spanish team to be ranked No. 2 in the ranking of FIBA.

In the senior team for two decades (2002-2021) point guard Laia Palau is the record-holder for most caps (314) and most medals (12) in 19 final tournaments. In the team since 2008, forward Alba Torrens is regarded as the most talented player of this generation, having won 8 medals in 11 tournaments.                                      

At the Mediterranean Games, Spain won gold in 1991, and bronze in 1993, 2001 and 2005.

Competition record

Team

2020 Olympic roster

Individual records
 Bold denotes players still playing international basketball.

Most capped players

Top scorers

Top highscorers
Top highscorers in official games (friendlies not included).

Top medallists

Most medals won with the national team in Olympic Games, Women's World Cups and EuroBaskets:

Head coaches
Timeline of head coaches with games and results in final tournaments at the (EuroBasket, Women's World Cup and Olympics)(*) 

 Assistant coach Víctor Lapeña was appointed as head coach for two 2017 EuroBasket qualifiers in November 2015

Youth teams

See also
Spanish Basketball Federation
Spain national basketball team
Spain national youth basketball teams

References

External links

 
FIBA profile
Spain National Team – Women at Eurobasket.com

 
Women's national basketball teams